Christopher Seseve Haiveta (born 20 September 1959) is a Papua New Guinean politician. He was the head of the Pangu Party of Papua New Guinea and a member of National Parliament. In 1993 he was named Deputy Prime Minister of Papua New Guinea. He also served as the governor of Gulf Province twice. Haiveta served as Minister of Finance in the government of Julius Chan from 1994 to 1997. They both resigned in 1997 during the Sandline Affair. Soon after that, Haiveta briefly became foreign minister but had left that post by the end of 1997. He became governor of Gulf Province for the first time in 1997, lost that post in 1998 and became governor again in 2002. He lost the election July 2007, and left the governorship later that year after the parliamentary elections. He worked for the Prime Minister's department following his election loss in 2007. 

In 2017 he was elected as Governor of Gulf Province for the 3rd time.

References 

Foreign Ministers of Papua New Guinea
Members of the National Parliament of Papua New Guinea
Ministers of Finance of Papua New Guinea
1959 births
Living people
People from Gulf Province
Pangu Party politicians
Deputy Prime Ministers of Papua New Guinea